The music of Liberia uses many tribal beats and often one of the native dialects, or vernacular. Liberian music includes traditional Gbema music, as well as the popular genre Hipco.

Gbema music or traditional music
Liberian music makes particular use of vocal harmony, repetition and call-and-response song structure as well as such typical West African elements as ululation and the polyrhythm typical of rhythm in Sub-Saharan Africa. Christian music was introduced to Liberia by American missionaries and Christian songs are now sung in a style that mixes American harmonies with West African language, rhythm and the call-and-response format.
Traditional music is performed at weddings, naming ceremonies, royal events and other special occasions, as well as ordinary children's songs, work songs and lullabies.

Popular music
Highlife music is very popular in Liberia, as elsewhere in West Africa.  It is a combination of North American, West African and Latin American styles, and emerged in the 1950s in Ghana, Sierra Leone and Liberia, especially among the Liberian Kru people, who were sailors that played Spanish guitar, banjo, pennywhistle, harmonica, accordion, mandolin and concertina.

Past and present musicians include Princess Hawa Daisy Moore, Fatu Gayflor, Nimba Burr, Tejajlu, Morris Dorley, Yatta Zoe, Anthony "Experience" Nagbe Gebah Swaray, Kandakai Duncan and Miatta Fahnbulleh.  Of these, Dorley deserves special notice for having spearheaded a movement to create a national Liberian identity, alongside musicians such as Anthony "Experience" Nagbe.  Dorley's popular songs include "Grand Gedeh County" and "Who Are You Baby".

The country's most renowned radio station is ELBC, or the Liberian Broadcasting System. Rap and pop music are also performed in indigenous languages across the country.

In 1963, President Tubman set up the new Cape-Palmas Military Band (CPMB). Israeli bandmaster Aharon Shefi formed and conducted a 56-piece concert and marching band that performed Liberian, American and universal folk and church music. The CPMB has performed on January 1, 1964, at President Tubman's inauguration in Monrovia.  Among the pieces played were Highlife, original marches by the late Liberian composer Victor Bowya, the National Anthem and "The Lone Star Forever". The CPMB had also performed in churches, schools, holidays and military parades and official events.

Hipco

Liberia has a uniquely Liberian rap genre called Hipco, or "Co". The "co" in the genre is short for the Liberian dialect Kolokwa. Hipco is usually performed in Liberian English or the local vernacular. Hipco evolved in the 1980s and has always had a social and political bent. In the 1990s it continued to develop through the civil wars. Hipco music was becoming popular in 2000., and as of 2017, it was the popular music genre of Liberia, "serving as the medium through which rappers speak against societal ills, including injustice and corruption." UNICEF has worked with Hipco artists to release Hipco songs on Ebola prevention, with several of the songs becoming popular on radio in the country in 2014. Among high-profile Hipco artists are Takun J.

See also
 Liberian Entertainment Awards
 Culture of Liberia
 C Liberia Clearly

References